Vettaikkaran is a 1964 Indian Tamil-language action drama film directed by M. A. Thirumugam and produced by Sandow M. M. A. Chinnappa Thevar. The film stars M. G. Ramachandran and Savitri Ganesh, with M. R. Radha, M. N. Nambiar, S. A. Ashokan, Thai Nagesh, M. V. Rajamma, Manorama and Baby Shakila in supporting roles. It revolves around an estate hunter whose penchant for hunting displeases his family, and a plunderer who lusts for his wealth.

Vettaikkaran was released on 14 January 1964, Pongal day. The film was a commercial success, running for 25 weeks in theatres.

Plot 

Babu is a wealthy estate owner and hunter. He is always in the forest hunting animals, much to the displeasure of his mother. He meets Latha, a woman lost in the forest. He rescues her, they fall in love and marry. Latha gives birth to Babu's son Raja who develops an extreme attachment to his father. Meanwhile, a plunderer Mayavan lusts for Latha. To get her, he makes Babu undergo untold miseries. He tricks Latha and Raja into the forest, and demands the papers of the estate. Babu arrives on time and kills Mayavan, saving both Latha and Raja in the process.

Cast 
 M. G. Ramachandran as Babu
 Savitri Ganesh as Latha
 M. R. Radha as Sundaram
 M. N. Nambiar as Mayavan
 S. A. Ashokan
 Thai Nagesh as Jokkar

 M. V. Rajamma as Babu's mother
 Manorama as Jokkar's wife
 Baby Shakila as Raja

Production 
Vettaikkaran was directed by M. A. Thirumugam and produced by Sandow M. M. A. Chinnappa Thevar under Devar Films. A real leopard was brought for filming.

Soundtrack 
The soundtrack is composed by K. V. Mahadevan, with lyrics by Kannadasan. According to Sachi Sri Kantha, the song "Unnai Arinthaal", through its lyrics which go "Unnai arinthaal – Nee unnai arinthaal, Ulagathil pooradalam" (Know yourself – You, know yourself, then you can fight the world) serves as an "MGR self-praise song, equating his 'good traits' to that of a living God" and Kannadasan "incorporates the Socratic wisdom of 'Know thyself' in the beginning lines".

Release 
Vettaikkaran was released on 14 January 1964, Pongal day, and distributed by Ramachandran's Emgeeyar Pictures. To promote the film, the Madras-based Chitra theatre had a jungle set to welcome audiences. After much deliberation, they also managed to get a caged tiger inside the theatre premises. Despite facing competition from another Pongal release Karnan, the film became a box office success, running for 25 weeks in theatres. It was dubbed Telugu-language as Inti Donga and released on 4 September 1964.

Reception 
The Indian Express wrote on 17 January 1964, "Loaded with fun and frolic with a substantial sprinkling of spicy scenes and intriguing drama told in a fascinating manner, [Vettaikkaran] is designed to please the filmgoer." T. M. Ramachandran of Sport and Pastime wrote on 22 February, "One would presume that Vettaikkaran, to justify the title, would provide all the thrills and excitement of big game hunting. But there is nothing of that sort in the film [...] The story is of course a hotchpotch of various ideas and punches freely borrowed from foreign films. The swift tempo with which the latter half of the film moves covers up a major portion of its deficiencies". On 26 January, Kanthan of Kalki said the film could be watched for the leopard, the scenery and the acting of Shakila.

References

Bibliography

External links 
 

1960s action drama films
1960s Tamil-language films
1964 films
Films about hunters
Films directed by M. A. Thirumugam
Films scored by K. V. Mahadevan
Indian action drama films